Susan Abigail Sarandon (née Tomalin; born October 4, 1946) is an American actor and activist. She is the recipient of various accolades, including an Academy Award, a British Academy Film Award, and a Screen Actors Guild Award, in addition to nominations for a Daytime Emmy Award, six Primetime Emmy Awards, and nine Golden Globe Awards. In 2002, she was honored with a star on the Hollywood Walk of Fame for her contributions to the film industry.

Sarandon began her acting career in the drama film Joe (1970), before appearing in the soap opera A World Apart (1970–1971). In 1974, she co-starred as a Zelda Fitzgerald surrogate in the television film F. Scott Fitzgerald and 'The Last of the Belles', and the following year, she starred as Janet Weiss in the musical comedy horror film The Rocky Horror Picture Show. Sarandon was nominated for the Academy Award for Best Actress for Atlantic City (1980), Thelma & Louise (1991), Lorenzo's Oil (1992), and The Client (1994), before winning for Dead Man Walking (1995). She has also won the BAFTA Award for Best Actress in a Leading Role for The Client, and the Screen Actors Guild Award for Best Actress for Dead Man Walking. Her other films include Pretty Baby (1978), The Hunger (1983), The Witches of Eastwick (1987), Bull Durham (1988), White Palace (1990), Little Women (1994), James and the Giant Peach (1996), Stepmom (1998), Enchanted (2007), Speed Racer (2008), The Lovely Bones (2009), Cloud Atlas (2012), Tammy (2014), The Meddler (2015), and A Bad Moms Christmas (2017).

Sarandon made her Broadway debut in the play An Evening with Richard Nixon (1972) and went on to receive Drama Desk Award nominations for the off-Broadway plays A Coupla White Chicks Sitting Around Talking (1979) and Extremities (1982). She returned to Broadway in the 2009 revival of Exit the King. On television, she is a six-time Primetime Emmy Award nominee, including for her guest roles on the sitcoms Friends (2001) and Malcolm in the Middle (2002), supporting role in the film You Don't Know Jack (2010), as well as a leading role as Doris Duke in the film Bernard and Doris (2008) and another leading role as Bette Davis in the miniseries Feud (2017).

Also known for her social and political activism, Sarandon was appointed a UNICEF Goodwill Ambassador in 1999 and received the Action Against Hunger Humanitarian Award in 2006. In November 2022, Sarandon joined the HALO Trust, the largest humanitarian mine clearance organization, as an ambassador.

Early life
Sarandon was born in Jackson Heights, Queens in New York City. She is the eldest of nine children of Lenora Marie (née Criscione 1923–2020) and Phillip Leslie Tomalin, an advertising executive, television producer, and one-time nightclub singer. She has four brothers: Phillip Leslie Jr., Terry (an outdoorsman, journalist, and community leader), Timothy, and O'Brian; and four sisters: Meredith (or "Merry"), Bonnie Priscilla, Amanda, and Melissa (or "Missy"). Her father was of English, Irish, and Welsh ancestry. His English ancestors came from Hackney in London and his Welsh ancestors from Bridgend. On her mother's side, she is of Italian descent, with ancestors from the regions of Tuscany and Sicily. Her father worked for WOR-TV in New York City.

When she was four years old, the Tomalin family moved from New York City to the newly developed Stephenville community, located in the northern area of Raritan (now Edison) Township, New Jersey. The family was raised Roman Catholic and she and her sisters attended the all-girls Saint Francis Grammar School in nearby Metuchen, while her brothers attended the all-boys Saint Matthews Grammar School in Edison Township. Her mother was a member and board director of the Stephenville Women's Club and the Terra Tova Garden Club. The family was also member to the Woodside Swim Club, a private swimming club and park in the Stephenville community, where Sarandon and her sisters won many swimming competitions. Sarandon graduated from Saint Francis Grammar School in 1960.

Sarandon attended Edison High School, a public school located in Edison Township. In 1962, while still in high school, she joined a band and dance group to entertain sick children at a nearby rehabilitation hospital. As a high school junior, she performed the lead in the play Lady Precious Dream. As a senior, she played the title character in the comedy My Sister Eileen, earning mentions in the local newspapers. In 1964, Sarandon was inducted into the National Honor Society.

In May 1964, the Tomalin family moved to the newly developed Chandler Hill community, east of Stephenville in Edison. Sarandon graduated from Edison High School in 1964. She attended the Catholic University of America in Washington D.C. from 1964 to 1968, earning a Bachelor of Arts in drama, and studying under the drama coach Gilbert V. Hartke. During and shortly after college, she supported herself by cutting hair, cleaning houses and working as a switchboard operator.

Career

In 1969, Sarandon went to a casting call for the motion-picture Joe (1970) with her then-husband Chris Sarandon. Although he did not get a part, she was cast in a major role of a disaffected teen who disappears into the seedy underworld. Between 1970 and 1972, she appeared in the soap operas A World Apart and Search for Tomorrow, playing Patrice Kahlman and Sarah Fairbanks, respectively. She appeared in The Rocky Horror Picture Show (1975) and also played the female lead in The Great Waldo Pepper (also 1975), opposite Robert Redford. She was twice directed by Louis Malle, in Pretty Baby (1978) and Atlantic City (1981). The latter earned Sarandon her first Academy Award nomination.

Her most controversial film appearance was in Tony Scott's The Hunger (1983), a modern vampire story in which she had a lesbian sex scene with Catherine Deneuve. She appeared in the comedy-fantasy The Witches of Eastwick (1987) alongside Jack Nicholson, Cher, and Michelle Pfeiffer. However, Sarandon did not become a "household name" until she appeared with Kevin Costner and Tim Robbins in the film Bull Durham (1988), a commercial and critical success. Roger Ebert praised Sarandon's performance in his review for the Chicago Sun-Times: "I don't know who else they could have hired to play Annie Savoy, the Sarandon character who pledges her heart and her body to one player a season, but I doubt if the character would have worked without Sarandon's wonderful performance".

Sarandon was nominated for an Academy Award four more times in the 1990s, as Best Actress in Thelma & Louise (1991), Lorenzo's Oil (1992), and The Client (1994), finally winning in 1995 for Dead Man Walking in which she played Sister Helen Prejean who regularly visits a convicted murderer on death row. Janet Maslin, in The New York Times, wrote of her performance in the last film: "Ms. Sarandon takes the kind of risk she took playing a stubbornly obsessed mother in Lorenzo's Oil. She's commandingly blunt, and she avoids cheapening her performance with the wrong kind of compassion. Her Sister Helen is repelled and alarmed by this man, but she's determined to help him anyway. That's what makes the film so unrelenting." Sarandon was awarded the Women in Film Crystal Award in 1994. Additionally, she has received eight Golden Globe nominations, including for White Palace (1990), Stepmom (1998), Igby Goes Down (2002), and Bernard and Doris (2007).

Her other movies include Little Women (1994), Anywhere but Here (1999), Cradle Will Rock (1999), The Banger Sisters (2002), Shall We Dance (2004), Alfie (2004), Romance & Cigarettes (2005), Elizabethtown (2005), and Enchanted (2007). Sarandon has appeared in two episodes of The Simpsons, once as herself ("Bart Has Two Mommies") and as a ballet teacher, "Homer vs. Patty and Selma". She appeared on Friends, Malcolm in the Middle, Mad TV, Saturday Night Live, Chappelle's Show, 30 Rock, Rescue Me, and Mike & Molly.

Sarandon has contributed the narration to two dozen documentary films, many of which dealt with social and political issues. In addition, she has served as the presenter on many installments of the PBS documentary series, Independent Lens. In 1999 and 2000, she hosted and presented Mythos, a series of lectures by the late American mythology professor Joseph Campbell. Sarandon also participates as a member of the Jury for the NYICFF, a local New York City Film Festival dedicated to screening films made for children between the ages of 3 and 18.

Sarandon joined the cast of the adaptation of The Lovely Bones, opposite Rachel Weisz, and appeared with her daughter, Eva Amurri, in Middle of Nowhere; both films were made in 2007.
In June 2010, Sarandon joined the cast of the HBO pilot The Miraculous Year, as Patty Atwood, a Broadway director/choreographer. However, the series was not picked up. In 2012, Sarandon's audiobook performance of Carson McCullers' The Member of the Wedding was released at Audible.com. Sarandon was the voice actor for the character of Granny Rags, an eccentric and sinister old lady, in the stealth/action video game Dishonored, released in 2012. She appeared in the films Arbitrage (2012), Tammy (2014), and  The Meddler (2015). In 2017, Sarandon portrayed Bette Davis in the first season of FX's anthology series Feud. She also appeared in A Bad Moms Christmas (2017)—the sequel to the 2016 film Bad Moms—as the mother of Carla Dunkler.

In 2018, she joined the "Social Impact Advisory Board " of the San Diego International Film Festival. In 2019, she connected with Justin Willman on Magic for Humans as a special guest on the Christmas episode. In Fall 2022, Sarandon starred in the FOX TV drama Monarch. It aired on Tuesday nights at 9:00 P.M after The Resident, which is created by Sarandon's nemesis Amy Holden Jones.

Political views and activism

Sarandon is known for her active support of progressive and left-wing political causes, ranging from donations to organizations such as EMILY's List to participating in a 1983 delegation to Nicaragua sponsored by MADRE, an organization that promotes "social, environmental, and economic justice". In 1999, she was appointed UNICEF Goodwill Ambassador. In that capacity, she has actively supported the organization's global advocacy, as well as the work of the Canadian UNICEF Committee. In 2006, she was one of eight women selected to carry in the Olympic flag at the Opening Ceremony of the 2006 Olympic Winter Games, in Turin, Italy. The same year, Sarandon received the Action Against Hunger Humanitarian Award. Sarandon was appointed an FAO Goodwill Ambassador in 2010. She donated fruit trees to the New York City Housing Authority's Jamaica Houses in 2018 in the borough of Queens. Sarandon visited the housing complex in person to help plant the trees.

Anti-war activism
Sarandon and Robbins both took an early stance against the 2003 invasion of Iraq, with Sarandon stating that she was firmly against war as a pre-emptive strike. Prior to a 2003 protest sponsored by the United for Peace and Justice coalition, she said that many Americans "do not want to risk their children or the children of Iraq". Sarandon was one of the first to appear in a series of political ads sponsored by TrueMajority, an organization established by Ben & Jerry's Ice Cream founder Ben Cohen. Along with anti-war activist Cindy Sheehan, Sarandon took part in a 2006 Mother's Day protest, which was sponsored by Code Pink.  In January 2007, she appeared with Robbins and Jane Fonda at an anti-war rally in Washington, D.C. in support of a Congressional measure to withdraw U.S. forces from Iraq.

Presidential politics
During the 2000 election, Sarandon supported Ralph Nader's run for president, serving as a co-chair of the National Steering Committee of Nader 2000. During the 2004 election campaign, she withheld support for Nader's bid, being among several "Nader Raiders" who urged Nader to drop out and his voters offer their support for Democratic Party candidate John Kerry. After the 2004 election, Sarandon called for US elections to be monitored by international entities.

In the 2008 U.S. presidential election, Sarandon and Tim Robbins campaigned for John Edwards in the New Hampshire communities of Hampton, Bedford, and Dover. When asked at We Vote '08 Kickoff Party "What would Jesus do this primary season", Sarandon said, "I think Jesus would be very supportive of John Edwards." She later endorsed Barack Obama.

In the 2012 U.S. presidential election Sarandon, along with film director Michael Moore, said that they were not thrilled with Obama's performance but hoped he would be re-elected. She said she and the administration haven't been allies. "I wouldn't say the White House has taken me under its wing and made me one of its best buddies," Sarandon said.

In the 2016 United States presidential election, she made public her support for Senator Bernie Sanders. On March 28, 2016, in an interview on All In with Chris Hayes, Sarandon indicated that she and other Sanders supporters might not support Hillary Clinton if Clinton is the Democratic nominee for president. She stated: "You know, some people feel that Donald Trump will bring the revolution immediately. If he gets in, then things will really explode." Hayes inquired as to whether it would be dangerous to allow Trump to become president, to which she replied: "If you think that it's pragmatic to shore up the status quo right now, then you're not in touch with the status quo". On October 30, 2016, she endorsed Green Party of the United States presidential candidate Jill Stein.

In an interview with The Guardian published on November 26, 2017, Sarandon said about Hillary Clinton: "I did think she was very, very dangerous. We would still be fracking, we would be at war [if she were president]".

Civil rights
In 1995, Sarandon was one of many Hollywood actors, directors and writers interviewed for the documentary The Celluloid Closet, which looked at how Hollywood films have depicted homosexuality.

Sarandon and Robbins appeared at the 2000 Shadow Convention in Los Angeles to speak about drug offenders being unduly punished. In 2004, she served on the advisory committee for 2004 Racism Watch, an activist group.

Sarandon has become an advocate to end the death penalty and mass incarceration. She has joined the team of people fighting to save the life of Richard Glossip, a man on death row in Oklahoma. In May 2015, Sarandon launched a campaign with fundraising platform Represent.com to sell T-shirts to help finance the documentary Deep Run, the story of a poor North Carolina teen undergoing a gender transition.

Since 2011
On March 12, 2011, Sarandon spoke before a crowd in Madison, Wisconsin protesting Governor Scott Walker and his Budget Repair Bill. On September 27, 2011, Sarandon spoke to reporters and interested parties at the Occupy Wall Street protest in New York City. Her use of the word Nazi to describe Pope Benedict XVI on October 15, 2011, generated complaints from Roman Catholic authorities, and the Anti-Defamation League, which called on Sarandon to apologize. Sarandon brought activist Rosa Clemente to the 75th Golden Globe Awards and participated in a rally against gun violence in June 2018.

On June 28, 2018, Sarandon was arrested during the Women Disobey protests, along with 575 other people, for protesting at the Hart Senate Office Building where a sit-in was being held against Donald Trump's migrant separation policy.

On May 27, 2021, Sarandon tweeted in support of the Palestinian people, in her words, "fighting against the apartheid government of Netanyahu", and of the Israeli people "that they too, will enjoy peace". She expressed support for Palestinian-American model Bella Hadid "for having the bravery to stand in solidarity with her people". She also co-signed an open letter criticizing Israel for labeling six Palestinian human rights groups as terror organizations, and quoted Desmond Tutu on the conflict saying that "true peace can ultimately be built only on justice". Sarandon was the executive producer for Soufra, a documentary that covered the development of a food truck in the Bourj el Barajneh Palestinian refugee camp in Beirut, Lebanon.

In February 2022, some law enforcement organizations criticized Sarandon for sharing a tweet that described a photo of police officers honoring a killed officer as fascism. She would later delete the tweet and post a message on Twitter to apologize.

Personal life
While in college, Susan Tomalin met fellow student Chris Sarandon, a Greek-American, and the couple married on September 16, 1967. They divorced in 1979 but she retained the surname Sarandon as her stage name. She was then involved romantically with director Louis Malle, musician David Bowie and briefly, actor Sean Penn. In the mid-1980s, Sarandon dated Italian filmmaker Franco Amurri, with whom she had a daughter, Eva Amurri (born March 15, 1985), who is also an actress. In 2017, Sarandon revealed that she had had an affair with British actor Philip Sayer, who she further revealed had been gay.

Beginning in 1988, Sarandon lived with actor Tim Robbins, whom she met while they were filming Bull Durham. They have two sons: John "Jack" Henry (born May 15, 1989) and Miles Robbins (born May 4, 1992). Sarandon, like Robbins, is a lapsed Catholic, and they both share liberal political views. Sarandon split with Robbins in 2009.

Following the end of her relationship with Robbins, she soon began a new one with Jonathan Bricklin, son of Malcolm Bricklin. Sarandon and Bricklin helped establish a chain of ping-pong lounges named SPiN. Sarandon is the co-owner of this New York ping-pong club and its Toronto branch SPiN Toronto. Sarandon and Bricklin broke up in 2015.

In 2006, Sarandon and ten relatives, including her son Miles, traveled to the United Kingdom to trace her family's Welsh genealogy. Their journey was documented by the BBC Wales programme, Coming Home: Susan Sarandon. Much of the same research and content was featured in the American version of Who Do You Think You Are? She also received the "Ragusani Nel Mondo" prize in 2006; her Sicilian roots are in Ragusa, Italy.

Sarandon has identified herself as bisexual, seemingly coming out during a September 2022 appearance on The Tonight Show Starring Jimmy Fallon. She had also previously told Pride Source in 2017 that her sexuality was "open" and "up for grabs", and on a 2021 episode of the Divorced Not Dead podcast she said of her dating interests "I don't care if it's a man or a woman. I mean, I'm open to all age, all color. And those for me, those things are just details."

She is a member of the Democratic Socialists of America.

Awards and nominations

Sarandon received the Lifetime Achievement Award at the 2009 Stockholm International Film Festival, was inducted into the New Jersey Hall of Fame in 2010, and received the Outstanding Artistic Life Award for her Outstanding Contribution to World Cinema at the 2011 Shanghai International Film Festival. In 2013, she was invited to inaugurate the 44th International Film Festival of India (IFFI) in Goa. In 2015, Sarandon received the Goldene Kamera international lifetime achievement award.

References

External links

 
 
 
 
 Susan Sarandon at the New Jersey Hall of Fame
 
 
 
 

1946 births
Living people
20th-century American actresses
21st-century American actresses
Actresses from New Jersey
Actresses from New York City
Activists from New York City
Activists from New Jersey
American anti–death penalty activists
American anti–Iraq War activists
American film actresses
American people of English descent
American people of Irish descent
American people of Italian descent
American people of Welsh descent
People of Sicilian descent
American television actresses
American voice actresses
Best Actress Academy Award winners
Best Actress BAFTA Award winners
Best Performance by a Foreign Actress Genie Award winners
Catholic University of America alumni
David di Donatello winners
FAO Goodwill ambassadors
Former Roman Catholics
American LGBT rights activists
Members of the Democratic Socialists of America
New Jersey Hall of Fame inductees
New York (state) Democrats
New York (state) socialists
Outstanding Performance by a Female Actor in a Leading Role Screen Actors Guild Award winners
People from Edison, New Jersey
People from Jackson Heights, Queens
American socialist feminists
American stage actresses
Edison High School (New Jersey) alumni
American bisexual actors
Bisexual actresses
LGBT people from New York (state)